Euryphura togoensis, or Suffert's commander, is a butterfly in the family Nymphalidae. It is found in Sierra Leone, Ivory Coast, Ghana, Nigeria, Cameroon and possibly Togo. The habitat consists of forests.

Adults are attracted to fallen fruit.

References

Butterflies described in 1904
Limenitidinae